The Belgian National Internet eXchange (BNIX) is an internet exchange point operated by the Belgian national research network BELNET. Created in 1995, it is one of the charter members of Euro-IX, the European Internet Exchange Association.

BNIX peering is available at a number of point of presence locations in Belgium:

 Interxion, Zaventem
 CenturyLink, Evere
 LCL, Diegem
Previously Belnet also operated a pop in Brussels. This location was taken out of service at the end of 2008. 

The three sites are connected via three 100 Gbit/s connections in a ring topology. BNIX carries IPv4, Multicast (since 1999) and IPv6 (since 2000) traffic.

BNIX charges connection fees and a monthly fee, depending on the type of connection.

See also 
 List of Internet exchange points

References

External links
BNIX site
Belnet site

Internet exchange points in Belgium
Internet in Belgium